Melber is a surname. Notable people with the surname include:

Ari Melber (born 1980), American attorney and journalist
Henning Melber (born 1950), German-Namibian Africanist and political activist

See also